Unisol can refer to:

 Universal Soldier (1992 film), a 1992 action movie
 Universal Soldier (cyborg), the supersoldiers in Universal Soldier
 Unisol (game), a logic game